Boeck is a surname. Notable people with the surname include:

August de Boeck (1865–1937), Flemish composer, organist and music pedagogue
Cæsar Peter Møller Boeck (1845–1917), Norwegian dermatologist born in Lier
Carl Wilhelm Boeck (1808–1875), Norwegian dermatologist born in Kongsberg
Christian Peder Bianco Boeck (1798–1877), Norwegian doctor, zoologist, botanist and mountaineer
Erna Boeck or Erna Steinberg (1911–2001), German track and field athlete who specialised in sprinting events
Eugen von Boeck (1823–1886), German educator and scientist who lived in Chile, Peru and Bolivia
Glen De Boeck (born 1971), Belgian former football player and manager
Johann Boeck (1743–1793), German actor
Jonas Axel Boeck (1833–1873), Norwegian marine biologist
Kurt Boeck (1855–1933), German theatre artist, traveller, and writer
Marcelo Boeck (born 1984), Brazilian professional footballer

See also
Besnier-Boeck disease or Sarcoidosis, also called sarcoid, is a disease involving abnormal collections of inflammatory cells (granulomas) that can form as nodules in multiple organs
Het Notite Boeck der Christelyckes Kercke op de Manner of Philips Burgh, rare surviving record book of the Old Dutch Church of Sleepy Hollow in Sleepy Hollow, New York
Boeckman (disambiguation)

fr:Boeck